Stockhaven Lake is a lake in Douglas County, in the U.S. state of Minnesota.

Stockhaven Lake derives its name from Hans G. von Stackhausen, a pioneer who settled there in 1870.

See also
List of lakes in Minnesota

References

Lakes of Minnesota
Lakes of Douglas County, Minnesota